Zeuxine, commonly known as verdant jewel orchids, is a genus of about eighty species of orchids in the tribe Cranichideae. They are native to parts of tropical Africa, Asia, Southeast Asia, New Guinea, Australia and some Pacific Islands. They have relatively narrow, dark green leaves and small, dull-coloured resupinate flowers with the dorsal sepal and petals overlapping to form a hood over the column. The labellum has a pouched base and its tip has two lobes.

Description
Orchids in the genus Zeuxine are terrestrial, perennial, deciduous, sympodial herbs with a fleshy, creeping, above-ground rhizome anchored by wiry roots. The leaves are thinly textured and stalked, arranged in a rosette at the base of the flowering stem or scattered along it. Small, resupinate dull-coloured flowers are often crowded along the short flowering stem which usually has protruding bracts. The dorsal sepal and petals overlap, forming a hood over the column. The lateral sepals overlap the base of the labellum which is usually white, has a pouched base and a number of stalkless glands. The column is short with two stigmas.

Taxonomy and naming
The genus Zeuxine was first formally described in 1826 by John Lindley who gave it the name Zeuxina but Zeuxine is the nom. cons. The description was published in the appendix of Collectanea Botanica. The name Zeuxine is derived from the Latin word zeuxis meaning "joining" or "yoking" in apparent reference to either the partly fused column or to the pollinia.

Distribution and habitat
Plants in the genus Zeuxine usually grow in dark, moist forests where the humidity is always high or near swamps and seepage areas. They occur in tropical regions between Africa and Asia, in Southeast Asia, New Guinea, Australia and some Pacific Islands. Fourteen species are endemic to China and ten in Taiwan. Zeuxine strateumatica is naturalised on the Hawaiian Islands and in the south-eastern United States.

List of species
The following is a list of species of Zeuxine recognised by the World Checklist of Selected Plant Families as at August 2018:

Zeuxine affinis (Lindl.) Benth. ex Hook.f. 
Zeuxine africana Rchb.f.
Zeuxine agyokuana Fukuy.
Zeuxine amboinensis  (J.J.Sm.) J.J.Sm.
Zeuxine andamanica King & Pantl.
Zeuxine arisanensis Hayata
Zeuxine baliensis J.J.Sm.
Zeuxine ballii P.J.Cribb
Zeuxine bifalcifera J.J.Sm.
Zeuxine blatteri C.E.C.Fisch.
Zeuxine bougainvilleana Ormerod
Zeuxine chowdheryi Av.Bhattacharjee & Sabap.
Zeuxine clandestina Blume
Zeuxine cordata  (Lindl.) Ormerod
Zeuxine curvata Schltr.
Zeuxine diversifolia Ormerod
Zeuxine elatior Schltr.
Zeuxine elmeri (Ames) Ames
Zeuxine elongata Rolfe
Zeuxine erimae Schltr. in K.M.Schumann & C.A.G.Lauterbach
Zeuxine exilis Ridl.
Zeuxine flava  (Wall. ex Lindl.) Trimen
Zeuxine fritzii Schltr.
Zeuxine gengmanensis  (K.Y.Lang) Ormerod
Zeuxine gilgiana Kraenzl. & Schltr.
Zeuxine glandulosa King & Pantl.
Zeuxine goodyeroides Lindl.
Zeuxine gracilis  (Breda) Blume
Zeuxine integrilabella C.S.Leou
Zeuxine kantokeiensis Tatew. & Masam.
Zeuxine kutaiensis J.J.Sm.
Zeuxine lancifolia  (Ames) Ormerod
Zeuxine leucoptera Schltr.
Zeuxine leytensis  (Ames) Ames
Zeuxine lindleyana T.Cooke
Zeuxine longilabris  (Lindl.) Trimen
Zeuxine lunulata P.J.Cribb & J.Bowden
Zeuxine macrorhyncha Schltr.
Zeuxine madagascariensis Schltr.
Zeuxine marivelensis  (Ames) Ames
Zeuxine membranacea Lindl.
Zeuxine mindanaensis  (Ames) Ormerod
Zeuxine montana Schltr. in K.M.Schumann & C.A.G.Lauterbach
Zeuxine mooneyi S.Misra
Zeuxine nervosa  (Wall. ex Lindl.) Benth. ex Trimen
Zeuxine niijimai Tatew. & Masam.
Zeuxine oblonga R.S.Rogers & C.T.White
Zeuxine odorata Fukuy.
Zeuxine ovalifolia L.Li & S.J.Li
Zeuxine ovata  (Gaudich.) Garay & W.Kittr.
Zeuxine palawensis Tuyama
Zeuxine palustris Ridl.
Zeuxine papillosa Carr
Zeuxine parvifolia  (Ridl.) Seidenf.
Zeuxine petakensis J.J.Sm.
Zeuxine philippinensis  (Ames) Ames
Zeuxine plantaginea  (Rchb.f.) Benth. & Hook.f. ex Drake
Zeuxine purpurascens Blume
Zeuxine reflexa King & Pantl.
Zeuxine regia  (Lindl.) Trimen 
Zeuxine reginasilvae Ormerod 
Zeuxine rolfiana King & Pantl.
Zeuxine rupestris Ridl.
Zeuxine samoensis Schltr.
Zeuxine stammleri Schltr.
Zeuxine stenophylla  (Rchb.f.) Benth. & Hook.f. ex Drake
Zeuxine strateumatica  (L.) Schltr.
Zeuxine tenuifolia Tuyama
Zeuxine tjiampeana J.J.Sm.
Zeuxine tonkinensis Gagnep.
Zeuxine triangula J.J.Sm.
Zeuxine vietnamica Aver.
Zeuxine violascens Ridl.
Zeuxine viridiflora  (J.J.Sm.) Schltr.
Zeuxine viridiflora var. latifolia J.J.Sm.
Zeuxine viridiflora var. viridiflora.
Zeuxine weberi  (Ames) Ames
Zeuxine wenzelii  (Ames) Ormerod

References

External links 

 
Cranichideae genera